Bexar County (  or) is a county in the U.S. state of Texas.  It is in South Texas and its county seat is San Antonio.

As of the 2020 census, the population was 2,009,324.  Bexar County is included in the San Antonio–New Braunfels, TX metropolitan statistical area. It is the 16th-most populous county in the nation and the fourth-most populated in Texas. Bexar County has a large Hispanic population with a significant growing African American population. With a population that is 59.3% Hispanic as of 2020, it is Texas' most populous majority-Hispanic county and the third-largest such nationwide.

History
Bexar County was created on December 20, 1836, and encompassed almost the entire western portion of the Republic of Texas. This included the disputed areas of eastern New Mexico northward to Wyoming. After statehood, 128 counties were carved out of its area.

The county was named for San Antonio de Béxar, one of the 23 Mexican municipalities (administrative divisions) of Texas at the time of its independence. San Antonio de Béxar—originally Villa de San Fernando de Béxar—was the first civil government established by the Spanish in the province of Texas. Specifically, the municipality was created in 1731 when 55 Canary Islanders settled near the system of missions that had been established around the source of the San Antonio River. The new settlement was named after the Presidio San Antonio de Béjar, the Spanish military outpost that protected the missions. The presidio, located at the San Pedro Springs, was founded in 1718 and named for Viceroy Balthasar Manuel de Zúñiga y Guzmán Sotomayor y Sarmiento, second son of the Duke of Béjar (a town in Spain). The modern city of San Antonio in the U.S. state of Texas also derived its name from San Antonio de Béjar.

Geography

The Balcones Escarpment bisects the county from west to northeast; to the north of the escarpment are the rocky hills, springs and canyons of the Texas Hill Country. South of the escarpment are Blackland Prairie and the South Texas plains. The San Antonio River rises from springs north of Downtown San Antonio, and flows southward and southeastward through the county.

Major highways

Bexar County has a comprehensive "wagon wheel" freeway system, with radial freeways and beltways that encircle Downtown San Antonio, allowing for simplified countywide freeway access, in a manner much like the freeways around Houston or Dallas.   San Antonio is unique, however, in that unlike Houston or Dallas, none of these highways is currently tolled.

  Interstate 10
  Interstate 35
  Interstate 37
  Interstate 410
  U.S. Route 87
  U.S. Route 90
  U.S. Route 181
  U.S. Route 281
  State Highway 16
  State Highway Loop 1604

Adjacent counties
 Kendall County (north)
 Comal County (northeast)
 Guadalupe County (east)
 Wilson County (southeast)
 Atascosa County (south)
 Medina County (west)
 Bandera County (northwest)

National protected area
 San Antonio Missions National Historical Park

State parkland
 Government Canyon State Natural Area

Communities

Cities

Multiple counties
 Cibolo (mostly in Guadalupe County)
 Elmendorf (small part in Wilson County)
 Fair Oaks Ranch (partly in Kendall and Comal counties)
 Lytle (mostly in Atascosa County and a small part in Medina County)
 San Antonio (county seat) (small parts in Comal and Medina counties)
 Schertz (partly in Guadalupe and Comal counties)
 Selma (partly in Guadalupe and Comal counties)
 Universal City (small part in Guadalupe County)

Enclave cities

 Alamo Heights
 Balcones Heights
 Castle Hills
 Hill Country Village
 Kirby
 Leon Valley
 Olmos Park
 Shavano Park
 Terrell Hills

Bexar County only

 Converse
 Grey Forest
 Helotes
 Live Oak
 Sandy Oaks
 Somerset
 Von Ormy
 Windcrest

Towns
 China Grove
 Hollywood Park
 St. Hedwig

Census-designated places
 Cross Mountain
 Lackland AFB
 Macdona
 Randolph AFB
 Scenic Oaks
 Timberwood Park

Other unincorporated communities

 Adkins
 Atascosa
 Bexar
 Boldtville
 Buena Vista
 Cassin
 Leon Springs
 Losoya
 Martinez
 Sayers
 Southton
 Thelma

Former communities
 Cottage Hill
 Fratt (former)
 Stone Oak
 Wetmore

Demographics

Note: the U.S. Census Bureau treats Hispanic/Latino as an ethnic category. This table excludes Latinos from the racial categories and assigns them to a separate category. Hispanics/Latinos can be of any race.

As of the 2010 United States census, there were 1,714,773 people living in the county. Of those, 72.9% were White, 7.5% Black or African American, 2.4% Asian, 0.8% Native American, 0.1% Pacific Islander, 12.7% of some other race and 3.5% of two or more races. 58.7% were Hispanic or Latino (of any race).

As of the census of 2000, 1,392,931 people, 488,942 households, and 345,681 families were residing in the county. There were 521,359 housing units at an average density of 418 per square mile (161/km2). The racial makeup of the county was 68.86% White, 7.18% Black or African American, 0.80% Native American, 1.61% Asian, 0.10% Pacific Islander, 17.80% from other races, and 3.64% from two or more races. About 54.35% of the population were Hispanic or Latino of any race.

Of 488,942 households, 36.60% had children under the age of 18 living with them, 50.50% were married couples living together, 15.50% had a female householder with no husband present, and 29.30% were not families. About 24.00% of all households were made up of individuals, and 7.40% had someone living alone who was 65 years of age or older. The average household size was 2.78 and the average family size was 3.33.

A Williams Institute analysis of 2010 census data found there were about 6.2 same-sex couples per 1,000 households in the county.

In the county, the population was distributed as 28.50% under the age of 18, 10.70% from 18 to 24, 30.60% from 25 to 44, 19.90% from 45 to 64, and 10.40% who were 65 years of age or older. The median age was 32 years. For every 100 females, there were 94.70 males. For every 100 females age 18 and over, there were 91.20 males.

The median income for a household was $38,328, and for a family was $43,724. Males had a median income of $30,756 versus $24,920 for females. The per capita income for the county was $18,363. About 12.70% of families and 15.90% of the population were below the poverty line, including 22.40% of those under age 18 and 12.20% of those age 65 or over.

Corrections
The Bexar County jail facilities are at 200 North Comal in downtown San Antonio, operated by the Bexar County Sheriff's Office (Javier Salazar, Sheriff). In late 2012, press reports noted an increase in the number of suicides at the facility. The issue was a topic of debate in the election for sheriff that year. The jail holds an average of about 3,800 prisoners in 2012, with a total capacity of 4,596, making it the fourth-largest in the state.

The Texas Department of Criminal Justice operates the Dominguez Unit, a state jail for men, in an unincorporated section of Bexar County.

Education
School districts in the county include:
 Alamo Heights Independent School District
 Boerne Independent School District
 Comal Independent School District
 East Central Independent School District
 Edgewood Independent School District
 Floresville Independent School District
 Fort Sam Houston Independent School District
 Harlandale Independent School District
 Judson Independent School District
 Lackland Independent School District
 Medina Valley Independent School District
 North East Independent School District
 Northside Independent School District
 Randolph Field Independent School District
 San Antonio Independent School District
 Schertz-Cibolo-Universal City Independent School District
 Somerset Independent School District
 South San Antonio Independent School District
 Southside Independent School District
 Southwest Independent School District

All of the county is in the service area of Alamo Community College.

Libraries
On September 14, 2013, Bexar County opened BiblioTech – Bexar County's Digital Library, the nation's first bookless library.

Property taxes

In 2016, for the third consecutive year, Bexar County increased the appraised value of businesses and residences. Most will hence find their property taxes will increase for the year, with higher payments for some beginning as early as November 1. The latest 7.5 percent increase in valuation follows an 11 percent rise in 2015, and a 7 percent jump in 2014. The 2016 total value for all property in the county is approximately $163 billion, or $13 billion more than in 2015. County residents express dismay to Mary Kieke, the deputy chief appraiser. "People are very upset. The tax system is absolutely broken," she said.

Military installations
 Brooks City-Base (decommissioned)
 Camp Bullis
 Fort Sam Houston
 Kelly Air Force Base (decommissioned)
 Lackland Air Force Base
 Randolph Air Force Base
 San Antonio Military Medical Center

Notable people 

 Carol Burnett, comedian and actress, was born and grew up in San Antonio
 Joan Crawford, actress, was born in San Antonio
Christopher Cross (born Christopher Charles Geppert), Grammy-winning, Oscar-winning, chart-topping pop music artist of the early 80's
 Dwight D. Eisenhower, 34th President of the United States; stationed at Fort Sam Houston in 1916
 Al Freeman, Jr., was born in San Antonio; he became an actor, known for ABC soap opera One Life to Live, and Malcolm X
 Rick Galindo, Republican member of the Texas House of Representatives from District 117 in Bexar County
 Mina Myoui, singer in South Korean group Twice
 Cyndi Taylor Krier, first woman and first Republican to be elected to the Texas Senate from Bexar County (1985–1993), and first woman and first Republican to be appointed as a Bexar County administrative judge (1993 to 2001)
 James Robertson Nowlin, United States District Judge for the Western District of Texas; one of the first two Republicans since Reconstruction to represent Bexar County in the Texas House of Representatives
 Ciro D. Rodriguez, member of Congress, previously 28th District, Texas, now 23rd District, Texas
 Michelle Rodriguez, actress, James Cameron's Avatar
 Robert Rodríguez, director of Spy Kids, Desperado, and Sin City
 Joe Sage, one of the first two Republicans since Reconstruction, with James Robertson Nowlin, to represent Bexar County in the Texas House of Representatives
 Alan Schoolcraft, former Republican member of the Texas House of Representatives
 Percy Sutton, former Manhattan Borough President, and civil rights attorney; clients included Malcolm X, and the owner of the Apollo Theater in Harlem and several radio stations
 Carlos I. Uresti, member of the Texas Senate from the 19th District
 Kevin Patrick Yeary, judge of the Texas Court of Criminal Appeals, effective 2015; assistant district attorney for Bexar County, 1998–2014

Climate

Politics
Bexar County has generally voted for Democratic candidates in most presidential elections, though from 1932 to 2012 it was a nationwide bellwether, supporting the winner in every election except 1968. Democrats perform well within the Connally Loop, which contains heavily Hispanic neighborhoods on the south and west sides of San Antonio, and African Americans on the east side. In recent years, Democrats have made inroads on the Northwest Side toward the University of Texas at San Antonio, and the Northeast Side toward Kirby. Republicans' strength is concentrated around the military bases plus wealthier enclaves such as Alamo Heights, Terrell Hills, and the far northern section of the county.

See also

 List of museums in Central Texas
 National Register of Historic Places listings in Bexar County, Texas
 Recorded Texas Historic Landmarks in Bexar County

References 
Specific

General
 Stephens, A. Ray, and William M. Holmes, Historical Atlas of Texas. University of Oklahoma Press, 1989.

External links
 Bexar County government
 
 Bexar County from the Texas Almanac
 Bexar County from the TXGenWeb Project
 Bexar County Jail Information
 Historic Bexar County materials, hosted by the Portal to Texas History.

 
Texas counties
1836 establishments in the Republic of Texas
Populated places established in 1836
Greater San Antonio
Majority-minority counties in Texas
Hispanic and Latino American culture in Texas